The men's doubles tournament at the 1979 US Open was held from August 28 to September 9, 1979 on the outdoor hard courts at the USTA National Tennis Center in New York City, United States. John McEnroe and Peter Fleming won the title, defeating Bob Lutz and Stan Smith in the final.

Seeds

Draw

Finals

Top half

Section 1

Section 2

Bottom half

Section 3

Section 4

External links
 ATP main draw
1979 US Open – Men's draws and results at the International Tennis Federation

Men's doubles
US Open (tennis) by year – Men's doubles